The canton of Mont-de-Marsan-2 is an administrative division of the Landes department, southwestern France. It was created at the French canton reorganisation which came into effect in March 2015. Its seat is in Mont-de-Marsan.

It consists of the following communes:
 
Benquet
Bougue
Bretagne-de-Marsan
Campagne
Laglorieuse
Mazerolles
Mont-de-Marsan (partly)
Saint-Perdon
Saint-Pierre-du-Mont

References

Cantons of Landes (department)